Carl Strehl (July 12, 1886 – August 18, 1971) was a German educator born in Berlin who was influential in the teaching of the blind.

History 
In December 1907, Strehl lost his eyesight while working in a chemical factory in New York. Later, after returning to Europe, he commenced with studies in Hamburg. In 1915, he was hired by University of Marburg ophthalmologist Alfred Bielschowsky (1871-1940) to assist with World War I soldiers who had been blinded by shell fragments and poison gas.

In March 1916 Strehl and Bielschowsky established the Verein blinder Akademiker Deutschlands (German Society of Blind Academicians), an association to provide higher education assistance for the blind.

In addition, Strehl was vice-president of the World Council for the Welfare of the Blind, and was a prominent member of the International Council of Educators of Blind Youth.

References 
 New Beacon; Journal of Blind Welfare
 Blista news April 2007 Gedenktafel für Carl Strehl (translated biography)

Heads of schools in Germany
1886 births
1971 deaths
People from Berlin
German blind people
Knights Commander of the Order of Merit of the Federal Republic of Germany